Yang Terbaik is a greatest hits album by Indonesian singer Ari Lasso. It was released on June 15, 2012 by Aquarius Musikindo. The album compiled eight songs from five previous studio albums with six newest songs, "Kisah Kita", "Karena Aku Tlah Denganmu", "Cintailah Aku Sepenuh Hati", "Satu Cinta", "Doa Untuk Cinta" and "Cinta Adalah Misteri". In marketing this album, Ari and the record label working with KFC that this album would be circulated in all KFC stores in Indonesia.

Track listing

References 

2012 compilation albums